This is a list of electoral division results in the Australian 2007 federal election for the state of New South Wales.

Overall

New South Wales

Banks 
This section is an excerpt from Electoral results for the Division of Banks § 2007

Barton 
This section is an excerpt from Electoral results for the Division of Barton § 2007

Bennelong 
This section is an excerpt from Electoral results for the Division of Bennelong § 2007

Berowra 
This section is an excerpt from Electoral results for the Division of Berowra § 2007

Blaxland 
This section is an excerpt from Electoral results for the Division of Blaxland § 2007

Bradfield 
This section is an excerpt from Electoral results for the Division of Bradfield § 2007

Calare 
This section is an excerpt from Electoral results for the Division of Calare § 2007

Charlton 
This section is an excerpt from Electoral results for the Division of Charlton § 2007

Chifley 
This section is an excerpt from Electoral results for the Division of Chifley § 2007

Cook 
This section is an excerpt from Electoral results for the Division of Cook § 2007

Cowper 
This section is an excerpt from Electoral results for the Division of Cowper § 2007

Cunningham 
This section is an excerpt from Electoral results for the Division of Cunningham § 2007

Dobell 
This section is an excerpt from Electoral results for the Division of Dobell § 2007

Eden-Monaro 
This section is an excerpt from Electoral results for the Division of Eden-Monaro § 2007

Farrer 
This section is an excerpt from Electoral results for the Division of Farrer § 2007

Fowler 
This section is an excerpt from Electoral results for the Division of Fowler § 2007

Gilmore 
This section is an excerpt from Electoral results for the Division of Gilmore § 2007

Grayndler 
This section is an excerpt from Electoral results for the Division of Grayndler § 2007

Greenway 
This section is an excerpt from Electoral results for the Division of Greenway § 2007

Hughes 
This section is an excerpt from Electoral results for the Division of Hughes § 2007

Hume 
This section is an excerpt from Electoral results for the Division of Hume § 2007

Hunter 
This section is an excerpt from Electoral results for the Division of Hunter § 2007

Kingsford Smith 
This section is an excerpt from Electoral results for the Division of Kingsford Smith § 2007

Lindsay 
This section is an excerpt from Electoral results for the Division of Lindsay § 2007

Lowe 
This section is an excerpt from Electoral results for the Division of Lowe § 2007

Lyne 
This section is an excerpt from Electoral results for the Division of Lyne § 2007

Macarthur 
This section is an excerpt from Electoral results for the Division of Macarthur § 2007

Mackellar 
This section is an excerpt from Electoral results for the Division of Mackellar § 2007

Macquarie 
This section is an excerpt from Electoral results for the Division of Macquarie § 2007

Mitchell 
This section is an excerpt from Electoral results for the Division of Mitchell § 2007

New England 
This section is an excerpt from Electoral results for the Division of New England § 2007

Newcastle 
This section is an excerpt from Electoral results for the Division of Newcastle2007

North Sydney 
This section is an excerpt from Electoral results for the Division of North Sydney § 2007

Page 
This section is an excerpt from Electoral results for the Division of Page § 2007

Parkes 
This section is an excerpt from Electoral results for the Division of Parkes § 2007

Parramatta 
This section is an excerpt from Electoral results for the Division of Parramatta § 2007

Paterson 
This section is an excerpt from Electoral results for the Division of Paterson § 2007

Prospect 
This section is an excerpt from Electoral results for the Division of Prospect § 2007

Reid
This section is an excerpt from Electoral results for the Division of Reid § 2007

Richmond 
This section is an excerpt from Electoral results for the Division of Richmond § 2007

Riverina 
This section is an excerpt from Electoral results for the Division of Riverina § 2007

Robertson 
This section is an excerpt from Electoral results for the Division of Robertson § 2007

Shortland 
This section is an excerpt from Electoral results for the Division of Shortland § 2007

Sydney 
This section is an excerpt from Electoral results for the Division of Sydney § 2007

Throsby 
This section is an excerpt from Electoral results for the Division of Throwsby § 2007

Warringah 
This section is an excerpt from Electoral results for the Division of Warringah § 2007

Watson 
This section is an excerpt from Electoral results for the Division of Watson § 2007

Wentworth 
This section is an excerpt from Electoral results for the Division of Wentworth § 2007

Werriwa 
This section is an excerpt from Electoral results for the Division of Werriwa § 2007

See also 
 Members of the Australian House of Representatives, 2007–2010

References 

New South Wales 2007
Elections in New South Wales